The Nandha Engineering College is an autonomous institution located at Erode - Perundurai, Main Road, Erode in the Erode district of Tamil Nadu in India. It is accredited by NAAC and NBA. It was founded by Nandha Institutions in 2001. Its purpose is the provision of technical education at undergraduate and postgraduate levels.

Admissions
Nandha Engineering College is an autonomous institution from 8 March 2013. The admissions are Based on Engineering counseling conducted by Anna university Chennai.

Academics
The institute has several departments, student community, technical support staff and an administration. The various departments in the institute are 

Engineering
Civil Engineering
Computer Science & Engineering [Both U.G & P.G]
Electrical and Electronics Engineering [Both U.G & P.G]
Electronics and Communications Engineering [Both U.G & P.G]
Mechanical Engineering [Both U.G & P.G]
Information Technology
Electronics and Instrumentation Engineering
Agricultural Engineering
Chemical Engineering
Science and Humanities
Management Studies
Master of Computer Applications

Campus

Location

Academic buildings
The academic zone of the institute includes the seven buildings, separate laboratories, auditorium with an accommodation of 1000 students at a time, an open-air auditorium called Nandha Square, a Conference hall and the library. The three-storey library with internet facility has a subscription of over 100 international journals and an IEEE Digital Library is also available with an elevator facility.

Residential hostels
Residential facilities are provided for students and staff on the campus. Separate hostels and mess For men and women are available. Each hostel is managed by an associate warden and each mess by a warden.

Student life
Every classrooms are engaged with a projector with internet facility for learning out of box. 24hrs free WiFi facility and mainly campus is free of ragging

Apart from academics, students in the institute are engaged in a variety of extracurricular activities but not limited to participation in National Cadet Corps, National Service Scheme, Red Ribbon Club, Youth Red Cross, Rotaract Club trekking, literary clubs, sports events, cultural club and two days are dedicated for college cultural and sports.

Flexible Faculty Selection
Nandha is the 1st institution in implementing FFS scheme in southern India for providing its students a sophisticated education that students can select their staff for their availed subjects. Project Based Learning is also provided for having practical knowledge and this is also left up to the student's own choice.

Annual events include a two-day technical event organized by the Electronics and Telecommunication Department; Radix, a technical event organized by the Electrical and Electronics Department; Techiez, a technical event organized by Computer Science department; TechCruise, and a technical event organized by Information Technology Department.

References

External links
Official Website
Admission Guidelines from Win Entrance
Rozgar Patrka about Nandha Engineering College Application forms
Studyplaces.com Review about Nandha Engineering College
Indiastudychannel about Nandha Engineering College
Connect.in.com Profile of Nanda College

Engineering colleges in Tamil Nadu
All India Council for Technical Education
Universities and colleges in Erode district
Educational institutions established in 2001
2001 establishments in Tamil Nadu